Macrocallista is a genus of saltwater clams, marine bivalve mollusks in the family Veneridae, the Venus clams.

Species
Species within the genus Macrocallista include:
 Macrocallista maculata (Linnaeus, 1758) – calico clam
 Macrocallista nimbosa (Lightfoot, 1786) – sunray venus clam

References

Bivalve genera
Veneridae